Drumkee is a townland in the southeast of County Tyrone, Northern Ireland. It is directly south of the area presently known as Coalisland  and east, and slightly north, of Dungannon. It is situated in the historic barony of Dungannon Middle and the civil parish of Killyman and covers an area of 285 acres. The barony's tax records dated 1666 list two families living in Drumkee.

The name derives from the Irish: Druim Chaoich (Ridge of the Blind Man) or Druim Ceath (ridge of western aspect).

Population
The population of the townland declined during the 19th century:

Drumkee presently has a population of around 150, and many of its inhabitants are relations. Surnames which appear on the 1666 list include McRory and Condson. By the mid-19th century, the name Hunter appears in Drumkee burial records.  The surname Mullan appears in a 1910 directory of the area.

See also
List of townlands of County Tyrone

References

Townlands of County Tyrone
Civil parish of Killyman